Guatteria augusti is a species of plant in the Annonaceae family. It is endemic to Peru.

References

 World Conservation Monitoring Centre 1998.  Guatteria augusti.   2006 IUCN Red List of Threatened Species.   Downloaded on 21 August 2007.

augusti
Endemic flora of Peru
Trees of Peru
Vulnerable flora of South America
Taxonomy articles created by Polbot